Morris DeWayne Madden (born August 31, 1960) is an American former professional baseball pitcher who played for the Detroit Tigers and the Pittsburgh Pirates of the Major League Baseball(MLB) between 1987 and 1989.

References

External links

1960 births
Living people
Albuquerque Dukes players
American expatriate baseball players in Canada
Baseball players from South Carolina
Buffalo Bisons (minor league) players
Detroit Tigers players
Glens Falls Tigers players
Lodi Dodgers players
Major League Baseball pitchers
People from Laurens, South Carolina
Pittsburgh Pirates players
Vero Beach Dodgers players
San Antonio Dodgers players
Spartanburg Methodist Pioneers baseball players
Tampa Tarpons (1957–1987) players
Toledo Mud Hens players
Vancouver Canadians players
Vermont Reds players